"Down to My Last Broken Heart" is a song written by Chick Rains, and recorded by American country music artist Janie Fricke.  It was released in November 1980 as the first single from the album I'll Need Someone to Hold Me When I Cry.  The song reached #2 on the Billboard Hot Country Singles & Tracks chart.

Chart performance

References

1981 singles
1980 songs
Janie Fricke songs
Song recordings produced by Jim Ed Norman
Columbia Records singles
Songs written by Chick Rains